Venus casina is a species of saltwater clam, a marine bivalve mollusc in the family Veneridae, the venus clams. While the species is classified by World Register of Marine Species as Venus casina, the Catalogue of Life uses Circomphalus casina.

Appearance

Venus casina has equally sized valves up to 50 mm in length with a "swollen" appearance. The species is characterised by concentric ridges on the outer surface of the shell, which is dirty white to beige, with occasional patches of pink.

Ecology

Venus casina is a suspension feeder found between the United Kingdom, West Africa and the Azores as well as in the Mediterranean Sea.

References

External links

Veneridae
Molluscs described in 1758
Taxa named by Carl Linnaeus